The Ordovician Bellefonte Formation (Obf) is a mapped bedrock unit in central Pennsylvania.

Description
The Bellefonte is defined as a medium-gray, brownish-weathering, medium-bedded dolomite and minor sandstone. The very fine grained Tea Creek Member lies above, and the crystalline Coffee Run Member lies below.

Depositional environment
Deposition of formations such as the Bellefonte Dolomite occurred in environments equivalent to the modern Bahama lagoons, east of Miami.

Age
Relative age dating of the Bald Eagle places it in the Ordovician period. It rests atop the Axemann Formation (Oa), or the Nittany Formation, for example between Tyrone and Water Street, Pennsylvania, where the Axemann is missing, and the Loysburg Formation of interbedded limestone and dolomite conformably overlies the Bellefonte Formation.

See also
Geology of Pennsylvania

References

Ordovician geology of Pennsylvania
Sandstone in the United States
Ordovician southern paleotemperate deposits